Western Electric Export Corporation (or simply Western Electric) is a manufacturer of vacuum tubes and high end audio gear. Based in Rossville, Georgia, the company is best known for building an ultra-premium version of the 300B electron tube. It traces its roots to 1872 and the Bell Telephone Company and the original Western Electric. The original AT&T-based company was shut down in 1984. The current company was started in 1995, when AT&T granted Charles G. Whitener (Westrex Corporation) a license to the trademark and intellectual property of the original Western Electric company.  The company has announced intentions to manufacture vacuum tubes for musical instruments, such as electric guitars

300B
Few factories make tubes of any kind as the market for these devices is small. Tubes have generally been replaced by transistors, which are much more efficient, smaller, produce less heat and are less expensive. However, there still exists a couple of markets for tubes, such as high end audio reproduction and many electric guitar amplifiers. The current product line consists of just the 300B, which was originally designed for use in telephone amplification in the 1930s. By the 1980s, they found use by audiophiles. Western Electric's tubes are considered "ultra-premium", designed for audiophiles who want the best and are willing to pay for it. In 2020, the price for a matched pair of these single-ended tubes was $1499, while a matched quad cost over twice as much.

Guitar amplifier tubes
In March of 2022, Western Electric announced it would soon be producing tubes for the guitar tube amplifier market. This includes the 6L6, EL34, 6V6, EL84, 12AX7 and others. This comes as most nations have banned imports from Russia because of the 2022 Russian invasion of Ukraine. At the same time, Chinese manufacturing is being phased out, leaving only a single factory in Slovakia (JJ Tubes) as a ready source for these vacuum tubes. The existing 300B tubes currently produced are very dissimilar to tubes used in guitar amps, however, many parts like the base mounts are identical, as well as the glass being made from the same material.

Western Electric has just finished a major expansion of their Georgia facility, a two-year undertaking that moved production to the current Rossville location and expanded room for production. According to company sources, the jump from making 300B to these other models is not that giant of a step because of the use of similar materials. The company expects the American-made tubes to be more expensive than compatible tubes from Russia or China. It confirmed that it has no intention of expanding outside of the United States.

Other products
In 2022, Western Electric began production of the 91E amplifier system, employing the 300B tube in a single ended configuration. The amplifier is a high-end model designed specifically for audiophiles, costing $15,000 or more. It can produce from 14 to 20 watts (at 8 ohms) per channel. This is considerably higher than the standard 10w per channel from a typical 300B amplifier. Like all their products, the amplifier is built in America.

References

External links
Official website

Guitar amplification tubes
Audio equipment manufacturers
Former Bell Media networks